Culham Court may refer to 

Culham Court, Berkshire, a Grade II* listed house near Remenham in Berkshire, England
Culham Court, Oxfordshire, a Grade II listed house near Abingdon in Oxfordshire, England